Benjamin Banneker Academic High School is a magnet high school located in Washington, D.C., that was originally built to serve as a neighborhood Junior High School. The school's name commemorates Benjamin Banneker, an African-American scientist, surveyor, almanac author and farmer.  In 1980, the school was converted to a magnet high school for academics.  The school is colloquially referred to by students and faculty as "Banneker".

Banneker was formerly located across the street from Howard University, but in 2021 a new campus opened at former Shaw Middle School site in Shaw. The former Banneker building will then become the site of Shaw Middle School following renovations. The school draws students from all parts of the city. Any student interested in applying must follow an entrance procedure, involving a multiple choice test, a written essay, an interview, recommendation(s), and a report of the applicant's standardized test scores and grades from previous years.

The school's current enrollment is approximately 450 students spanning from grades 9 through 12, up from 393 in 2009–10.  Benjamin Banneker Academic High School is an IB Diploma Programme world school. Banneker AHS is consistently ranked among the best high schools in the United States in U.S. News & World Report's national rankings, coming in 575th in 2015, 602nd in 2017, and 136th in 2021.  In the District, Banneker is among the top high schools, awarded 2nd in 2015, 3rd in 2017, and 2nd in 2021.

Community 

The school had the honor of hosting President Barack Obama for the yearly "Back To School" speech in September 2011 and October 2016.

Extracurricular activities

Athletics
The school offers boys and girls basketball, volleyball, softball, tennis, track & field, cross country, soccer, and boys basketball and soccer.

Robotics 
The robotics club has participated in the Lemelson-MIT InvenTeams competition, twice winning a grant for their inventions: "Cell-Mate" (a cell-phone locker, 2006) and "DeadStop" (a door-hinge locker to prevent classroom access to terrorists, 2013).  These successful inventions have showcased at other events, and the students applied for patents for their work.

NASA OPSPARC competition
In the 2018 OPSPARC competition for students to invent a new use for NASA technology, Mikayla Sharrieff, India Skinner and Bria Snell, three black Banneker juniors, won second place with equipment to remove lead from school water fountains. The public voting component of the final was cut short after members of 4chan disrupted voting by both discouraging voting for the girls on racial grounds and hacking.

References

External links

 

Public high schools in Washington, D.C.
Magnet schools in Washington, D.C.
Benjamin Banneker